Lancaster Airpark  is an aerodrome located  north north-east of Lancaster, Ontario, Canada.

References

Registered aerodromes in Ontario